This is a list of characters in the USA Network original comedy-drama TV series White Collar.  The principal cast of the series has remained mostly the same throughout the series.  However, various recurring characters have appeared over the course of the show's run.

Main characters

: Thomason was credited in the main cast in the pilot, but did not appear again until the first-season finale, in which she was a guest star.

Neal Caffrey

Neal Caffrey (Matt Bomer) is a former conman who, after being caught escaping from prison, begins to work for the FBI's white collar crime unit under the supervision of Special Agent Peter Burke.

In the first episode, Neal is finishing a four-year prison sentence. His girlfriend, Kate, visits him in prison to break up with him. In order to get her back, he stages an elaborate prison break. Peter Burke, the agent who put Neal in prison to begin with, quickly catches up with Neal, where it is revealed that Kate has left only a bottle of Bordeaux behind at their apartment. Neal is quickly brought back to prison, where he is told he will have to serve four more years. After helping Peter and his team find an elusive criminal, the Dutchman (Mark Sheppard), Neal is released on the condition that he wear an ankle monitor that records his movements. He easily finds lodging with an elderly woman, June, and the two quickly become close.

Throughout the series, Neal helps the FBI solve difficult cases, using his vast knowledge of white collar crime. He is a skilled thief and art forger, among other criminal activities. Neal uses his position at the FBI in order to get closer to Kate; however, after her death, he uses it to find her killer.

During the first season, Neal spends much of his time researching Kate's disappearance. With the help of his best friend, Mozzie, Neal learns that Kate was taken by a man with an FBI ring. After discovering that Peter had visited her, Neal believes that Peter is the man behind her disappearance. This causes a strain on their relationship, though it eventually recovers. Neal finds that in order to free Kate, he must find the music box. He recruits an old friend, Alex Hunter, to do so in "Home Invasion" (1.11). The two continue to search over the next several episodes. In "Out of the Box" (1.14), after Neal locates Kate, who has boarded an airplane, he witnesses her death.

Over the second season, Neal reveals much about his past. In "Forging Bonds" (2.11), he tells Peter that his first con with Mozzie involved a man named Vincent Adler. Adler introduced Neal to Kate, and the two quickly began a relationship. Months later, Neal and Kate discovered that Adler had been caught running a Ponzi scheme, and they lost all of their money. After Kate realized that Neal was conning her as well, she left him and began running her own cons. However, Neal found her. After the two confessed their love, Neal was arrested (for the first time) by Peter. Back in the present day, Neal meets an insurance investigator named Sara Ellis. At first, Sara tries to have Neal arrested for the theft of a painting. However, the two, who have a history, eventually begin dating. Upon Adler's return and defeat in "Under the Radar", Mozzie's machinations to steal the U-boat treasures lead to Peter suspecting that Neal had conned him into leading him to the treasure. Neal, upset over Peter's decided lack in trust in him, simply demands for him to prove it.

In the first episode of the third season, Neal has been recommended for a possible commutation due to his part in capturing super evil-doer, Matthew Keller. Keller kidnapped Peter's wife Elizabeth (Tiffani Thiessen) in order to ransom a treasure Neal and his fellow con, Mozzie (Willie Garson), had in their possession. Peter and Diana spent much of last season trying to find out if Neal had the treasure and Peter is justifiably pissed off that a psychopath has snatched his wife to get it. Neal and Mozzie are ready to give up the treasure for Elizabeth and Neal and Peter work on some bromance trust issues while trying to stall Keller long enough for Diana and Jones to locate Elizabeth. Because Keller confesses to stealing the treasure, Neal doesn't go to prison and is offered a chance at freedom. The rest of the season turns into a test of Neal's trustworthiness with each case they solve, and how they solve it, weighing on Peter's mind as he decides what to tell the hearing panel.

Peter Burke
Special Agent in Charge Peter Burke (Tim DeKay) is an FBI agent, and the head of the Manhattan White Collar Division. He is married to Elizabeth and is the direct superior of Neal, Diana, and Jones. He has a dog named Satchmo.

Peter is a no-nonsense, by-the-book agent, who is extremely devoted to his wife. After teaming up with Neal, he is forced to enter various awkward situations, including flirting with other women and assuming various aliases (including, in one case, Neal Caffrey). However, Peter still upholds high moral and ethical standards.

In the pilot episode, it is shown that Peter has been working the Neal Caffrey case for several years. After spending three years attempting to catch Neal, he finally did, and Neal went to prison for almost four years. However, Neal escaped from prison. This time, Peter easily caught him, finding him at the apartment he had shared with Kate. Over the first season, Peter warns Neal, on various occasions, not to investigate Kate's disappearance, as it could cause him to slip back into his criminal ways. The two catch various white collar criminals together, including thieves, murderers, and other conmen.

In Season 2, it was mentioned that Peter's father was a construction worker, and he attended college (Harvard University, according to the diploma on his office wall) on scholarship; he graduated with an A.B. (bachelor's degree) in mathematics and subsequently did two years of accounting. He grew up in Upstate New York.

In a third-season episode, it is revealed that Peter has an astronomy hobby which was put to good use to solve a case involving an astronomical puzzle involving a kidnapper using an inheritance as a ransom.

By the end of the second season, Peter discovers that Neal may have been conning him from the very beginning and has very high suspicions that Neal stole the submarine treasure. In the third season summer finale, things between Peter and Matthew Keller become very personal when Keller kidnaps Elizabeth to force Peter to help him steal the treasure from Neal.

During the third season Peter acknowledges his Eagle Scout rank responding to his wife, "Yeah, Eagle Scout, always be prepared" when asked about having the will in his pocket. Peter also informs Neal that after college he was drafted by the Minnesota Twins as a pitcher, but quit after a serious injury occurred during his second week there.

In Season six, Elizabeth becomes pregnant and in the series finale has their son, whom they name Neal.

Mozzie
Mozzie (Willie Garson) is a close friend to Neal, and a fellow conman. He is characterized by his quirky qualities and generally mysterious nature.

Mozzie first met Neal while they were independent conmen, as shown through flashbacks in "Forging Bonds" (2.11). The two set up a long con on a man named Vincent Adler, though the plan eventually failed.

Throughout the first season, Mozzie uses his various connections to the criminal world to help Neal with both his investigations with Peter and his private investigation into Kate's disappearance. Mozzie is very distrusting of the FBI, and doesn't even meet Peter until mid-way through the season. After their first encounter, Peter refers to Mozzie as "Neal's friend", and Mozzie refers to Peter and Elizabeth as "Suit" and "Mrs. Suit". He goes on to form a very close friendship with Elizabeth which Peter finds both amusing and questionable.

During the second season, Mozzie becomes more involved with the FBI, especially when a close friend and romantic interest of his, Gina, is kidnapped in "By the Book" (2.04). He also becomes much more involved with the investigation into Kate's murder, discovering the identity of the last person Kate spoke to (Fowler) and breaking the code of the music box. In "Point Blank" (2.09), Mozzie is shot and left for dead, before he can tell anyone the meaning of the music box code. He barely survives, and later joins Burke's Seven (in the episode of the same name) to take down the man who shot him. Eventually, he and Neal discover that the man who shot him is involved with Vincent Adler, the man behind Kate's death.

In the third season, it is revealed that Mozzie was abandoned on the doorstep of an orphanage with a stuffed bear named Mozart. Unable to pronounce the name "Mozart", he used to call the Bear "Mozzie". He kept the bear with him even after he ran to New York to escape the Detroit Mob, and he named himself after it. He had to leave Detroit because he conned the local mob boss there. It was also revealed that he is the famed Dentist of Detroit. This all occurred when Mozzie was twelve years old, and it shocks and impresses both Neal and Peter.

In "Out of the Frying Pan" (5.2), it is revealed that Mozzie's real name is Theodore (Teddy) Winters.

Lauren Cruz
Special Agent Lauren Cruz (Natalie Morales) is an FBI agent who briefly worked in the white collar crime unit under Peter. She transferred to his team in "Threads" (1.02) and left after the events of "Out of the Box" (1.14).  Morales left the show before production of the second season.

Lauren joined Burke's team early in the first season, transferring from the organized crime division. She is fascinated by Neal, having written her thesis about him while at Quantico. She assists with Neal and Peter's cases throughout the season, until being abruptly written out of the show between the first and second seasons.

Diana Berrigan
Special Agent Diana Berrigan (Marsha Thomason) is an FBI agent in the white collar crime unit, working under Peter. She first appeared in the pilot episode and was promoted to a main character beginning in "Withdrawal" (2.01).

Diana is one of the few people that Peter trusts implicitly, which contributes to her return to his team at the beginning of season two. She is the daughter of a diplomat, and spent much of her childhood in and out of hotel rooms. Her bodyguard, who greatly influenced her life (and through Diana, Neal's), was killed while protecting her. Diana is in a relationship with a woman named Christie, though it is strained because of Christie's reluctance to live in New York. Christie first appears in the third-season episode "Deadline" played by Moran Atias.

Diana was absent for much of the first season, as she transferred to the Washington, D.C. office for a desk job at the end of the pilot. However, she returns to New York in "Out of the Box" (1.14) to help Peter investigate Garrett Fowler, and eventually rejoins Peter's team.

In the second season, after the disappearance of the music box, it is shown to be in Diana's possession. Later, with the help of Alex Hunter, Neal steals it.

In the season three episode "Pulling Strings" Diana announces that the couple is engaged to be married. Diana is apprehensive, since the possibility of getting legally married is something she never thought could happen.

Diana reports that Christie and she have broken up in the season four episode "Honor Among Thieves", and reveals that she is pregnant, via sperm donor, in the season five premiere, reflecting Marsha Thomason's real-life pregnancy.

Clinton Jones
Special Agent Clinton Jones (Sharif Atkins) is an FBI agent in the white collar crime division, working under Peter. He first appeared in the pilot episode and has appeared in every episode since. Atkins was added to the starring cast in the fourth season.

Jones attended Harvard Law School and later joined the FBI. While at Harvard he was engaged to a woman named Isabella, but she left Jones for his best friend Jimmy (shown in season 3 episode 8), whom she later married with Jones present at their wedding. Peter uses him often when researching a lead or when he is in need of backup. Jones often is forced to "babysit" Neal or do surveillance duty in the FBI van, which he does not enjoy. It is revealed in the episode "As You Were" (3.08) that Jones is trained in Kali, is a U.S. Naval Academy graduate and chose a career in the FBI after his military commitment.

Sara Ellis
Sara Ellis (Hilarie Burton) is an insurance investigator for Sterling-Bosch who has a history with Neal. Sara is a sharp, skilled investigator, and initially mistrustful of Neal. Over time, she becomes an increasingly important part of Peter's extended team, as she is slowly drawn into a romantic relationship with Neal until she finds out that Neal and Mozzie have been hiding the missing stolen art treasures from a World War II German U-boat pursued by Neal's nemesis, Matthew Keller. She eventually forgives Neal when they are forced to work together, and they resume their relationship at the end of the third season.

In 3.14 it is revealed that Sara was engaged to her boss, whom she is investigating in the same episode, Brian McKenzie, but broke off the engagement when he wanted to extend Sterling-Bosch beyond insurance. Sara revealed that her older sister ran away when she was little (though in Season 2, Episode 5, she said she was an only child). She gave a statement in Neal's favor when agent Kramer pursued him. However, when Neal left without telling her goodbye, she was hurt, as stated in 4.04, feeling as if she had lost a family member all over again. They later resume their relationship until Sara gets a job offer in London.

Elizabeth Burke
Elizabeth Burke (Tiffani Thiessen) is an event planner, and is married to Peter. It is shown in first season that Peter followed her and did background checks in order to ask Elizabeth out (although unromantic, this mirrors real-life guidelines of the personal lives of law enforcement and intelligence agents). Elizabeth is a periodic "consultant" to the FBI and has assisted on various cases, using her professional activities as a convincing cover. She is even seen teaching Peter how to flirt with other women when he is going undercover, and on occasion demonstrates a cooler head in a crisis than her husband or Neal. She is kidnapped by Matthew Keller at the end of episode "Countdown" (3.10), but later escapes.

Elizabeth is a sisterly figure to Neal and has a special friendship with Mozzie, while he calls her "Mrs. Suit".

Recurring characters

Rebecca Lowe/Rachel Turner
Rebecca Lowe (real name Rachel Turner) (Bridget Regan) is Neal's girlfriend in season five. Neal plans a con where they set up an art thief, a rival of Mozzie's, to steal a piece of art and then get caught while Neal copies a chapter in an old book. Neal meets Rebecca when he investigates the museum. She is later fired from the museum and believes that Neal is an FBI agent because of a con that Neal, Mozzie, and Neal's landlord set up to get more information about why the book chapter information is so valuable. Neal is fortunate that Peter thinks that Neal was only lying to Rebecca about his true job at the FBI to date her and does not know about the book when Peter crashes Neal and Rebecca's date. Neal later tells Rebecca the truth about him consulting on cases and why he needed the information and Rebecca locks the door and they proceed to have sex. Rebecca helps with the glass pane scheme in the mid-season finale. It is later discovered that she is really Rachel Turner, a disgraced former MI5 agent. She did professional recon on Peter, Elizabeth, Neal, David Siegel, and the rest of the White Collar unit, set up Hagan, and killed him and Siegel. In the season six premiere, she helps the FBI and Peter to find Neal when he is kidnapped by her partner. After a brief conversation with Neal, she is escorted by the US Marshals back to maximum security, but decides to get herself killed by reaching for a gun on her way to the car.

June Ellington
June Ellington (Diahann Carroll) is a widow who allows Neal to stay in her home.  Her husband, Byron, was a conman as well. June has a granddaughter named Cindy and a niece named Samantha. June first met Neal while in a thrift store when she offered him a room in her luxurious home where he stays throughout the series.  She becomes both a trusted friend and an integral part of many cases, both asking for and offering help (appearing in 27 episodes).  She first displays her singing talents in "Home Invasion", and then she contributes to a case in "Empire City" by starring as the opening act at a jazz club under investigation. In the episode "Power Play", she helps teach Peter how to be a thief.

Kate Moreau
Kate Moreau (Alexandra Daddario) was Neal's girlfriend. Her disappearance and murder were the primary story arc throughout the first and second seasons. Kate first met Neal while working for Vincent Adler. She began a relationship with Neal, who she believed was Nick Halden. Adler pulled a billion dollar Ponzi scheme and vanished, along with a lot of people's—including Neal and Kate's—money. Kate is later killed in a plane explosion, leaving Neal depressed and angry. It is later revealed that Vincent Adler was responsible for Kate's murder.

Matthew Keller
Matthew Keller (Ross McCall) is Neal's blue-collar counterpart and nemesis. Unlike Neal, he is willing to murder to make a score. At the end of "Countdown" he kidnaps Elizabeth to force Peter to help him steal the submarine treasure from Neal, making things personal between Peter and him. In "Checkmate" Keller says that Elizabeth will be returned to Peter if he, Neal, and Mozzie help him steal the treasure. During this episode, it is revealed that Neal and Keller used to be close friends. Keller even seems somewhat upset that Neal doesn't seem to want to remember the "good old days".

Reese Hughes
Special Agent in Charge Reese Hughes (James Rebhorn) is an experienced agent in the FBI's white collar crime unit, and is Peter and Neal's direct superior.  Hughes is supportive of Peter's use of Neal, but is at first skeptical of the former conman, believing that he will eventually return to his criminal ways. However, as time passes, he begins to see Neal's value.

Garrett Fowler
Former Special Agent Garrett Fowler (Noah Emmerich) is a disgraced agent from the Office of Professional Responsibility. He was once suspected to be the man behind Kate's death. Fowler headed Operation Mentor, which focused on taking down Peter Burke.  It was also used to search for the music box.

It is also known that Fowler once had a wife who was later murdered; from this Fowler wanted revenge and subsequently went on to kill his late wife's killer. This was covered up by someone who is able to pull a lot of strings and he was transferred to OPR.

Alex Hunter
Alexandra Hunter (Gloria Votsis) is a high-end fence and an old lover and ally of Neal. According to records that the FBI has on her, she has "powerful friends", and has only been arrested once—in France.

Neal met Alex while he worked for Vincent Adler. He singled her out and set her up in a meeting with Adler, where she was scared away. Alex later approached Neal, where he informed her that he 'would not apologize' for his actions, and that it was his job to catch her and her job to 'not get caught.' Alex then asks him out for drinks, where they eventually end up in Neal's bed. Afterwards, she tells him about the music box that Vince Adler wants, informing Neal that it was 'worth about as much' as the Holy Grail.

After some time, Neal contacts her to do the music box job, but it ultimately fails and Neal is forced to leave Alex in a French hospital while he returned to New York.

Toward the end of the first season, Alex was given a plane ticket to Italy by the FBI, having helped Neal recover the elusive music box from the Italian consulate in Manhattan, because there was a 'target on her back'. During the episode 'Copycat Caffrey' she asks Neal for his help. She has been fencing gold Krugerrands in an effort to stay under the radar, but is about to be set up by one of Mozzie's contacts who is selling her out to the people who are hunting for Neal. After helping the FBI to recover a stolen painting and a case full of Krugerrands, Peter presents her with a ticket to Italy and she leaves the country, but not for long.

Early in the second season Alex returns to New York and helps Neal steal the music box again—this time from Diana's personal safe, although his method to contact her involves forging an FBI case file and a clandestine meeting on a rooftop. He makes a comment that he doesn't have her phone number, and that it would be easier to contact her 'like a normal person' if she gave it to him. After Alex anonymously donates the music box to the Russians—its rightful owners—she meets Neal at his apartment and finally gives him her number before leaving.

Neal is later reunited with Alex when Vincent Adler kidnaps them and Peter. With Alex hostage, Adler forced Neal and Peter to open the TNT-covered entrance to the German U-boat full of Nazi treasure. Once the three of them are saved by Peter's FBI team, Neal and Alex kiss, revealing that there is still some lingering romantic feelings between them.

In the fourth season she returns to New York after a 16-months prison stay in Athens.

Vincent Adler
Vincent Adler (Andrew McCarthy) was the CEO of a massive hedge fund, believed to be the driving power behind Kate's murder. Neal tells Peter that he first learned of Adler from Mozzie when Neal and Mozzie planned a long-con: to infiltrate Adler's organization and take him down. Peter and Neal later realize that Adler is "the man pulling the strings".  He is the person responsible for Kate's death. Adler is eventually killed by Peter Burke in order to save Neal's life.

Minor characters 
 Cindy (Denise Vasi) is June's granddaughter.  She first appeared in the pilot episode and returned with the third season premiere, "On Guard" (3.01).
 Christie (Moran Atias) is Diana's girlfriend. She is a physician who works at a hospital. She first appeared in the episode "Deadline" (3.03).  In the third season episode "Pulling Strings" (3.14), Christie proposed to Diana. Diana reports the couple's breakup in the season four episode "Honor Among Thieves".
 Senator Terrence Pratt (Titus Welliver) is the main antagonist in season 4.
 Amanda Callaway (Emily Procter) is the new Special Agent in Charge of the White Collar Division in the two last episodes of season 4.
 David Siegel (Warren Kole) is Neal's new handler in season 5, when Peter has a new assignment as the leader of the White Collar Division. He first appeared in "Out of the Frying Pan" (5.02) and he is killed in the next episode "One Last Stakeout" (5.03) by Rebecca Lowe.
Curtis Hagan/The Dutchman (Mark Sheppard) is a con artist, art restorer and a skilled forger. He was the subject of the investigation in the pilot episode and is the main antagonist in the first half of season 5.

References

Lists of American television series characters
Lists of comedy television characters
Lists of drama television characters